Saurocetes is an extinct genus of probable iniid river dolphins from South America. Two species have been described: S. argentinus and S. gigas. It has been suggested that Saurocetes is a synonym of the possible platanistid Ischyrorhynchus.

Description 
Saurocetes remains are fragmentary, consisting of isolated teeth, rostral fragments and mandibular fragments.

Taxonomy
Typically, Saurocetes is regarded as a member of the Iniidae, a family represented by one extant genus, Inia. However, it was noted as far back as 1926 that the taxonomy of Saurocetes is highly unstable, even at a family level. Several specimens referred to the possible platanistid genus Ischyrorhynchus closely resemble Saurocetes in many respects, and it is possible that the two genera are synonymous.

References

River dolphins
Cetacean genera
Neogene Argentina